The Native Village of Kluti-Kaah is an Alaska federally recognized Alaska Native tribal entity located in Copper Center, Alaska. The village is primarily made up of the Ahtna Athabaskan people, who have been in the Copper River basin from time immemorial.

References 
Koyukon Athabaskan Dictionary, Jules Jette, Eliza Jones, James Kari (Editor); 2000,

External links 
Kluti Kaah on Bering Sea.com

Alaska Native tribes